Aetius, Aëtius, or Aetios (Ἀέτιος) may refer to:

People 
 Aetius (philosopher), 1st- or 2nd-century doxographer and Eclectic philosopher
 Aëtius of Antioch, 4th-century Anomean theologian
 Flavius Aetius, Western Roman commander in chief who fought Attila the Hun
 Aetius (praetorian prefect), fl. 419–425, praefectus urbi of Constantinople and Praetorian prefect of the East
 Aëtius of Amida, 6th-century Byzantine physician
 Sicamus Aëtius, Byzantine medical writer possibly identical with the preceding
 Aetios (eunuch), early 9th century Byzantine official and general
 Aetios (general) (died 845), Byzantine general at the Sack of Amorium and one of the 42 Martyrs of Amorium
 Aëtius (bishop), 3rd century AD Arian bishop
 Aeci (Aetius), bishop of Barcelona (995–1010)

Other uses
 Aetius (spider), a genus of spiders
 AETIOS Productions, a Canadian film production company

See also 
 Ezio (disambiguation), the Italian form
 Aécio, the Portuguese form